Hopkins School District 270 is a public school district in the U.S. state of Minnesota. The district is one of the larger districts in the state, and covers all of Hopkins, Minnesota as well as parts of Minnetonka, Golden Valley, Eden Prairie, Edina, Plymouth, and St. Louis Park. The district is strong both academically and athletically, having won numerous awards and championships. Hopkins School District offers a K-12 Mandarin Chinese immersion program, which attracts students from within the district and from other school districts. Once within the high school, Chinese becomes a class offered for 90 minutes within the day. The boys basketball team is particularly strong, having won multiple state titles.

History
In 1980 the Golden Valley School District merged into the Hopkins district. Under Minnesota law it was a consolidation.

Schools

Elementary schools (K–6)
Meadowbrook Elementary School
Tanglen Elementary School
Alice Smith Elementary School
Gatewood Elementary School
Glen Lake Elementary School
Eisenhower Elementary School
XinXing Academy- Chinese immersion school

Junior high schools (7–9)
9th Grade is considered freshmen year of high school despite being in a separate building.
 Hopkins North Junior High School
 Hopkins West Junior High School

High school (10–12)
Hopkins High School

References

External links
 

School districts in Minnesota
Education in Hennepin County, Minnesota